She Makes Comics is a 2014 documentary film about the history of women in the comic book industry since the medium's beginnings in the early 1900s. It features interviews with key industry professionals, including artists, writers, editors, and retailers, as well as with prominent members of the surrounding fan culture.

Background 
She Makes Comics is the fifth co-production between Respect Films and Sequart Organization. The film was directed by Marisa Stotter, who began working with Respect Films during the summer of 2013. Production began in October 2013, with several interviews conducted in the Southern California region.

Kickstarter campaign 
On February 3, 2014, Sequart Organization launched a Kickstarter campaign to fund the film. Over the 31-day funding period, the campaign raised $54,001, nearly $15,000 more than the initial goal. This surplus allowed the project to announce several stretch goals, including a mini-documentary about the first female African-American cartoonist, Jackie Ormes, that would be a companion to She Makes Comics.

Production 
The filmmakers traveled to several cities, including New York and San Diego, to conduct interviews with notable figures in comics. Among the creatives interviewed are writer Kelly Sue DeConnick, X-Men writer Chris Claremont, Elfquest creators Wendy and Richard Pini, artist Becky Cloonan, and Tits & Clits artist Joyce Farmer. The industry professionals interviewed include former executive editor of DC Comics' Vertigo imprint Karen Berger, former president of DC Comics Paul Levitz, former DC publisher Jenette Kahn, Comic-Con International organizer Jackie Estrada, and Comics Beat's Heidi MacDonald. Additional interviews were filmed with various scholars, journalists, entertainers, and prominent members of the fan community.

Release 
The film had its festival premiere at the Comic-Con International Film Festival in 2015, where it won the best documentary award. The film was subsequently acquired for distribution by XLRator Media.

Plot 
The film traces the history of women in comic books as industry professionals and as fans. It begins with the early days of comics and follows the rise of women in the emerging comic book industry of the 30s and 40s. It tells the story of women's contributions to mainstream comics, featuring such figures as artists Ramona Fradon (who drew for DC Comics) and Marie Severin (who worked at Marvel Comics). The film also focuses on the underground comics movement of the 70s, the rise of women into prominent positions at mainstream publishers in the 80s, and the flourishing of female creators in independent comics and webcomics.

References

External links 
 
 

2014 films
Documentary films about comics
Female comics artists
Female comics writers
Women and comics
2010s English-language films
American documentary films
2014 documentary films
2010s American films